Atiwa East is one of the constituencies represented in the Parliament of Ghana. It elects one Member of Parliament (MP) by the first past the post system of election. The Atiwa East constituency is located in the Atiwa district of the Eastern Region of Ghana.

Boundaries 
The seat is located entirely within the Atiwa district of the Eastern Region of Ghana.

Members of Parliament

Elections 
Abena Osei Asare the current MP for the Atiwa East constituency.

See also 

 List of Ghana Parliament Constituencies
 Atiwa District

References

Parliamentary constituencies in the Central Region (Ghana)